Joseph Thewlis (14 April 1939 – 24 November 2010) was an English cricketer and footballer. In cricket, Thewlis was a right-handed batsman who bowled right-arm medium pace. He was born in Percy Main, Northumberland.

Cricket career
Serving in the Royal Air Force allowed Thewlis to make his only first-class appearance for the Combined Services against Cambridge University in 1962. He scored a single run in the Combined Services first-innings, before being dismissed by Paul Ramage. In their second-innings, he scored 17 runs before being dismissed by the same bowler.

He made his debut for Northumberland in the 1963 Minor Counties Championship against Durham. Thewlis played Minor counties cricket for Nothumberland from 1963 to 1981, which included 152 Minor Counties Championship appearances. He scored 2,225 runs in total, taking 100 catches as well. He made his List A debut against Lincolnshire in the 1971 Gillette Cup. In this match, he was dismissed for 7 runs by Sonny Ramadhin. He made a further List A appearance against Somerset in the 1977 Gillette Cup. In this match, he dismissed for 19 runs by Ian Botham. He also captained Northumberland on a number of occasions.

Football career
Thewlis played mostly for the reserves of Everton and Newcastle United, as well as for North Shields and Spennymoor United.

Personal life
Thewlis was married for 34 years before separating from his wife. They had two children. His nephew, Michael Thewlis, also played Minor counties and List A cricket for Northumberland. Thewlis died in Newcastle upon Tyne on 24 November 2010, following a battle with cancer.

References

External links

1939 births
2010 deaths
Sportspeople from North Shields
Footballers from Tyne and Wear
Cricketers from Tyne and Wear
20th-century Royal Air Force personnel
English cricketers
Combined Services cricketers
Northumberland cricketers
English footballers
Everton F.C. players
Newcastle United F.C. players
North Shields F.C. players
Spennymoor United F.C. players
Deaths from cancer in England
Association footballers not categorized by position